Marie Thérèse Henderson is a Scottish music director and composer. She teaches at the Sophia University Institute of the Focolare Movement. She is linked to the music group Gen Verde.

References

British women composers
Scottish composers
Living people
Year of birth missing (living people)
Place of birth missing (living people)